Glidewell is an unincorporated community in Greene County, Missouri, United States.

Glidewell is located approximately four miles north of Springfield, just east of Missouri Route 13 on a county road that accesses McDaniel Lake on the Little Sac River.

References

Unincorporated communities in Greene County, Missouri
Springfield metropolitan area, Missouri
Unincorporated communities in Missouri